The New Guinea snake-eyed skink (Cryptoblepharus novaeguineae) is a species of lizard in the family Scincidae. It is endemic to Indonesia and Papua New Guinea.

References

Cryptoblepharus
Reptiles described in 1928
Taxa named by Robert Mertens